Sam Mahmoudi Sarabi is the editor for the Idea & history and book services of Shargh Newspaper who has been summoned to the Intelligence Ministry on February 14, 2011 and has been in detention since then.
He was for some time (2012-2014) in Middle East and North Africa (MENA) Advisor at Human Rights Watch (HRW). After that, he worked as a freelance journalist with some of Persian opposition media like Roozonline, Radiozamaneh, Sharq_e_Parsi (the Persian 
department of the London's branch of Al-Sharq Al-Awsat Newspaper), Khodnevis, etc.
Mahmoudi Sarabi, along with Majid Niknam, Babak Ejlali, Ruhollah Zam and Ahmad Shams is one of the founders of "Amadnews" media   and he was the chief editors of this media for more than two years.

Prison
According to the Human Rights House of Iran, there is no information as to the reason for his arrest and the alleged charges. His summons order had taken place over the phone.

Mahmoudi had been arrested during the Ashura events and was held in detention for 45 days.
The charges against him are propaganda against the regime and insulting the leader, as well as writing the song “I Confess...” and possessing a copy of Salman Rushdie's The Satanic Verses.

Mahmoudi has told his interrogators he acquired the controversial novel because he planned to publish a special article on the anniversary of the death sentence issued by Ayatollah Khomeini against Rushdie.

Mahmoudi was arrested for more than a month during the protests that followed the disputed re-election of Mahmoud Ahmadinejad and was released on a $300,000 Dollars.

See also 
 Hoda Saber
 Haleh Sahabi

References

External links
 Journalist Sam Mahmoudi in Poor Physical and Psychological Condition
 64 Prisoners testify: Jailed activist Hoda Saber beaten up before death

Living people
Iranian activists
Iranian prisoners and detainees
1976 births
Faculty of Letters and Humanities of the University of Tehran alumni